The Best of Ash is the second greatest hits album by the band Ash, released on 17 October 2011.

The CD/DVD edition of the album includes the Teenage Wildlife documentary of Ash's 1977 tour, which is narrated by Ewan McGregor, as well as 17 of the band's music videos.

Track listing

 'Girl from Mars'
 'Kung Fu'
 'Angel Interceptor'
 'Goldfinger'
 'Oh Yeah'
 'A Life Less Ordinary'
 'Wild Surf'
 'Shining Light'
 'Burn Baby Burn'
 'Walking Barefoot'
 'Sometimes'
 'Clones'
 'Orpheus'
 'Starcrossed'
 'You Can't Have It All'
 'Twilight of the Innocents'
 'Return of White Rabbit'
 'Arcadia'
 'Jack Names the Planets' (2011 re-recording)

Sources for songs

 Tracks 1-5 are from 1977, released in 1996
 Track 6 is from the soundtrack to A Life Less Ordinary, released in 1997
 Track 7 is from Nu-Clear Sounds, released in 1998
 Tracks 8-11 are from Free All Angels, released in 2001
 Tracks 12-14 are from Meltdown, released in 2004
 Tracks 15-16 are from Twilight of the Innocents, released in 2007
 Tracks 17-18 are from the A-Z Series, released in 2009
 Track 19 is a re-recording of a track from Trailer, originally released in 1994

References

Ash (band) albums
2011 compilation albums